Media is a borough in and the county seat of Delaware County, Pennsylvania. It is part of the Delaware Valley metropolitan statistical area.

Media was incorporated in 1850 at the same time that it was named the county seat. As of the 2020 U.S. census, the population was 5,991.

History
The history of the area goes back to William Penn, but the area remained predominantly rural until the twentieth century. Land in the area was sold and settled soon after William Penn was named proprietor of the colony of Pennsylvania in 1681 by King Charles II of England. Peter and William Taylor bought the land where Media is now located, directly from Penn. At the time, the land was located in Chester County. Providence Township was organized in 1684, and later divided into Upper Providence and Nether Providence townships by 1690, even though they only had 40 taxable properties at the time. The current borough, formed in 1850, sits between the two townships.

In 1683, the Court of Chester County approved the construction of "Providence Great Road" (now Pennsylvania Route 252). The road, which runs north from Chester to within a few blocks of today's downtown, is shown on a 1687 map along with the names of local landowners. It forms the eastern border of the borough.

Thomas Minshall, a Quaker, was an early Media resident, settling just outside the small village then known as "Providence", along the Providence Great Road. The village then included a tailor shop, blacksmith shop, wheelwright shop, barn and other buildings.

Minshall bought  from William Penn and arrived in 1682. The Providence Friends Meeting was established at his house in February 1688, and a meetinghouse was later built on land he donated for the purpose. The original meetinghouse was built out of logs in 1699 or 1700, and the current building dates to 1814. A house on Minshall's property, built c. 1750, still stands and was given to the citizens of the borough in 1975.

Chester County, Pennsylvania was divided in 1789, the eastern portion becoming Delaware County, Pennsylvania. The area in the center of the new county remained rural through 1850. On March 11, 1850, the Commonwealth of Pennsylvania by Special Act of Assembly incorporated the Borough of Media, and made the sale of malt and spirituous liquors unlawful within its borders. At the same time, the county seat of Delaware County was moved to Media from Chester. The borough was formed from four farms purchased by the county, totaling only . The borders of the borough have not changed since that time.

Streets were plotted in a rectangular grid around the location of the new courthouse, lots were sold at public auctions, and the construction of houses began. Sources agree that Minshall Painter, a descendant of Thomas Minshall, suggested the name "Media", but do not agree on the reason. The name most likely comes from the borough's "median" location in the direct center of Delaware County. In 1940, the Pennsylvania guide described Media by noting that "[t]he majority of its houses, almost all built since the Civil War, sit far back on shaded lawns and seem somewhat gloomy. The borough has a large and prosperous business section and a few small industrial plants; many townspeople work in Philadelphia or Chester."

The John J. Tyler Arboretum occupies part of Thomas Minshall's original . This farm and a nearby Village of Lima was used by the Underground Railroad. The land was donated to a public trust in 1944 by an eighth-generation descendant. The arboretum was started as a private collection by brothers Jacob and Minshall Painter. In 1825, they began systematically planting over 1,000 varieties of trees and shrubs. Over twenty of their original trees survive, including a giant sequoia.

Minshall Painter was also a leader of the Delaware County Institute of Science, which was formed on September 21, 1833, with just four other members: George Miller, John Miller, George Smith, M.D., and John Cassin. The institute was incorporated in 1836. About 1850, Painter gave the institute the land where its building currently stands at 11 Veterans Square, and the building was constructed in 1867.

In the second half of the 19th century, Media was a summer resort for well-to-do Philadelphians. The borough's large vacation hotels included the Idlewild Hotel (1871) on Lincoln Street at Gayley Terrace, Chestnut Grove House or "The Colonial" (1860) on Orange Street, and Brooke Hall on Orange Street and Washington Avenue (now Baltimore Avenue). The Chestnut Grove was used for a year by nearby Swarthmore College due to a fire on its campus.

The West Chester and Philadelphia Railroad was built through Media on October 19, 1854. Electrified service was opened on December 2, 1928. Up to 50 trains passed through each day. The railroad became part of the Philadelphia, Wilmington and Baltimore Railroad and eventually the Penn Central. SEPTA took over operations in 1983. Woodrow Wilson spoke at the Media Station in 1912 during his first election campaign. Trolley transportation lines spread to and through Media in the 1890s and early 1900s.

  The Media Theatre opened as a vaudeville house in 1927. The first 'talkie' film, The Jazz Singer, was shown there. It remained a popular cinema through the 1970s and 1980s. In 1994, the theater underwent a $1 million restoration by Walter Strine Sr. and re-opened as the 'Media Theatre for the Performing Arts'''. Shows produced there have included The Full Monty, Carousel and Miss Saigon.

On March 8, 1971, the Citizens' Commission to Investigate the FBI raided an FBI "resident agency" in Media. They later released thousands of documents to major newspapers around the country. These documents revealed FBI tactics, like the recruitment of Boy Scouts as informants, and confirmed for the first time the existence of COINTELPRO, an FBI program to "expose, disrupt, misdirect, discredit, or otherwise neutralize" dissident groups in the United States.

In June 2006, Media became the first town in the United States to follow over 300 towns in Europe in attaining fair trade certification. To meet the criteria for certification, Media passed a council resolution in support of fair trade, served fair-trade coffee and tea in local government meetings and offices, ensured that a range of fair-trade products were available in local restaurants and businesses, raised popular support and provided media coverage for the fair-trade campaign, and convened a fair-trade steering committee to ensure continued commitment.

Local historic districts
Three locally recognized historic districts were designated by the borough in 1975.  These districts are
 Courthouse Square, from Olive to Orange Streets between 2nd and Jasper Streets.
 Lemon Street, from Baker to Front Streets.
 Providence Friends' Meeting House District, from Front to 2nd including the meetinghouse to Haldeman.

Landmarks

 Homes 
 Minshall House (c.1750) on Route 252
 Cooper House (before 1870) on State Street, home of Thomas Valentine Cooper, Pennsylvania State Senator and Representative
 Dr. Samuel D. Risley House (1877), 430 N. Monroe Street
 Gayley House (1855) 301 Gayley St., originally the Media Classical Institute, a Presbyterian academy founded by Rev. Samuel Maxwell Gayley. In 1923, the building became a convent for Nativity BVM Catholic Church. It has served as Nativity's parish center since 2005.
 Hillhurst (1890) on Orange Street, designed by Addison Hutton and owned by John Biddle as a summer home.
 Jaisohn House (1925), 100 East Lincoln Street

 Municipal/Civic 
 Delaware County Institute of Science (1867) on Veterans Square. The institute was founded in 1833,
 Delaware County Courthouse (1871) on Front Street
 Provident National Bank (1900) on State Street at Veterans Square, designed by Albert Dilks
 Media Armory (1908) on State St., designed by Will Price and M H. McClanahan. Added to the National Register of Historic Places in 1989. Now home to the PA Veterans Museum and Trader Joe's grocery store.
 Media Theatre (1927, restored 1994) on State St., designed by Louis Magaziner as a Beaux-Arts movie palace with Art Deco design elements.
 Old Rose Tree Tavern (1809), listed on the National Register of Historic Places in 1971

 Churches 
 Media Vineyard Church
 Campbell A.M.E (African Methodist Episcopal) Church
 Christ Church (Episcopalian)
 Congregation Beth Israel, in Middletown Township - the oldest Reconstructionist congregation in the Delaware Valley, founded in 1925.
 Faith Reformed Baptist Church
 First Baptist Church of Media
 First United Methodist
 Honeycomb Union AME Church
 Media Presbyterian Church (1855) on Baltimore Ave. designed by John McArthur Jr., architect of Philadelphia City Hall.
 Brooke Hall Female Seminary (1856) Finishing school at Lemon St. and Baltimore Ave, attended by future first lady, Ida (Sexton) McKinley.
 Media Presbyterian Church
 Nativity BVM Church (1882) 30 E. Franklin St. Designed by Philadelphia ecclesiastical architect, Edwin Durang.
 The Brick Church (1862) Nativity BVM's original church. Used as a school (1882–c.1950) after the main church was built. Currently used as a hall.
 Quaker meetinghouses: Media Friends Meeting and Providence Friends Meetinghouse.
 Media Monthly Meeting of the Religious Society of Friends (1875) and Media-Providence Friends School (1876), both located at 125 W. 3rd Street
 St. George (Greek Orthodox)
 Second Baptist Church of Media
 Trinity U.A.M.E. (Union American Methodist Episcopal) Church
 Unitarian Universalist Church of Delaware County

 Parks 
There are several parks located within the borough of Media and shared with surrounding communities.
 Rose Tree Park
 Barrall Park (aka Barrall Field)
 Glen Providence Park
 Houtman Park
 Philip Green Park
 Muriel Jaisohn Memorial Park and Nature Sanctuary
 Cherry Street Park
 Milton Park
 Scott Park

 Geography and climate 

Media is located in central Delaware County at  (39.918761, -75.388127).

Media is situated on high ground ( above sea level) draining west to Ridley Creek, a south-flowing tributary of the Delaware River.

Media has a humid subtropical climate (Cfa) and the hardiness zone is 7a.

Demographics
As of Census 2010, the racial makeup of the borough was 83.4% White, 10.6% African American, 0.1% Native American, 3.5% Asian, 0.5% from other races, and 1.9% from two or more races. Hispanic or Latino of any race were 2.5% of the population .

As of the census of 2000, there were 5,533 people, 2,782 households, and 1,112 families residing in the borough. The population density was 7,399.0 people per square mile (2,848.4/km2). There were 2,966 housing units at an average density of 3,966.3 per square mile (1,526.9/km2). The racial makeup of the borough was 81.02% White, 14.22% African American, 0.14% Native American, 2.01% Asian, 0.02% Pacific Islander, 0.65% from other races, and 1.93% from two or more races. Hispanic or Latino of any race were 1.88% of the population.

There were 2,782 households, out of which 14.9% had children under the age of 18 living with them, 27.2% were married couples living together, 9.5% had a female householder with no husband present, and 60.0% were non-families. 49.2% of all households were made up of individuals, and 11.7% had someone living alone who was 65 years of age or older. The average household size was 1.85 and the average family size was 2.73.

In the borough the population was spread out, with 13.7% under the age of 18, 8.3% from 18 to 24, 34.3% from 25 to 44, 23.0% from 45 to 64, and 20.6% who were 65 years of age or older. The median age was 41 years. For every 100 females, there were 83.9 males. For every 100 females age 18 and over, there were 81.9 males.

The median income for a household in the borough was $42,703, and the median income for a family was $58,065. Males had a median income of $42,121 versus $31,904 for females. The per capita income for the borough was $28,188. About 6.1% of families and 7.9% of the population were below the poverty line, including 9.7% of those under age 18 and 11.2% of those age 65 or over.

The population in 1900 consisted of 3,075 people, whose numbers grew to 3,562 in 1910, and to 5,351 in 1940.

 Media ZIP Code 
The term "Media" is often used to include not only the borough of Media, but other municipalities but that share the ZIP Code.

According to the United States Postal Service, the following addresses are included in the 19063 ZIP Code: Elwyn, Garden City, Glen Riddle, and Rose Valley. Other areas at least partially included in the 19063 zip code are: Upper Providence Township; Nether Providence Township, the neighborhoods of South Media, Bowling Green, Pine Ridge and Ridgewood; and most of Middletown Township, including, Bortondale, Riddlewood, and Lima.

 Government 
The borough of Media is run by a mayor and an elected borough council. Their main responsibility is to ensure the safety and livelihood of the residents of Media. Mayor Bob McMahon was first elected in 1992; Brian C. Hall serves as President and Elizabeth Romaine serves as Media's Vice-President. Current Borough Council members are: Kevin Boyer, Mark Paikoff, Paul Robinson, Peter Williamson, and Joi Washington.

Education
Primary and secondary schools
Media lies within the Rose Tree Media School District, created by a merger with the Rose Tree Union School District and Media Borough School District in 1966. Public school students living within borough boundaries attend Media Elementary School, located in Downtown Media, for grades K-5. Springton Lake Middle School serves students in grades 6–8, and Penncrest High School serves students in grades 9–12.

The Media-Upper Providence Friends School is the only private school in the borough.

Mother of Providence Regional Catholic School in Wallingford is the area Catholic school of the Roman Catholic Archdiocese of Philadelphia. It formed in 2012 from a merger of Nativity BVM School, which was Media's only pariochal school and St. John Chrysostom in Wallingford. Nativity BVM school opened in 1912, with its last building occupied in 1949. The Nativity BVM school administration chose not to file an appeal against the 2012 order to merge. Some parents had lobbied for the continued operation of the school. The archdiocese had originally planned to make Nativity BVM the regional campus, but changed when St. John Chrystosom had appealed against that decision. After the closure, Media Elementary School occupied the campus while renovations of the permanent Media Elementary occurred.

Tertiary education
 Pennsylvania Institute of Technology, a two-year junior college;
 Williamson College of the Trades, a three-year technical college
 Delaware County Community College, a two-year liberal arts college

Public libraries
Media is also served by the Media-Upper Providence Free Library.

 Transportation 
Highways

U.S. 1 formerly ran through the borough until the "Media bypass" was completed in 1960. The bypass has an unusual "volleyball" or three-level diamond interchange with Interstate 476. The former Route 1 through the center of Media is known by its older name, Baltimore Avenue, changing to "Baltimore Pike" outside the borough limits.

Route 252, Providence Road, runs along the Eastern border of Media borough.

Philadelphia International Airport (PHL), the eleventh-busiest airport in the world in 2007, is 11 miles' driving distance (about a 15-minute drive) from downtown Media, following Baltimore Pike east, then Interstate 476 south and Interstate 95 northeast.Google Map directions

 SEPTA Trolley & Train 
 Media Station is a SEPTA rail station of the Media/Wawa Line.
 The SEPTA Routes 101 and 102, also known as the Media-Sharon Hill Line are light-rail trolleys that run through Media to the 69th Street Transportation Center in Upper Darby.  The trolley line ends in Media at the Media-Orange Street station.

 Gallery 

Notable people
 Government / politics 
 Jesse Matlack Baker (1854-1913), Pennsylvania State Representative and State Senator
 Crosby M. Black (1866-1916), Pennsylvania State Representative and mayor of Chester, Pennsylvania
 John Martin Broomall, member of the U.S. House of Representatives from Pennsylvania from 1863 to 1869
 Orson Flagg Bullard, (1834-1906), Pennsylvania State Representative
 William H.G. Bullard, admiral of the United States Navy
 Thomas Valentine Cooper, Pennsylvania State Senator and Representative
 Edward Darlington, member of the U.S. House of Representatives from Pennsylvania from 1833 to 1839
 Philip Jaisohn, Korean nationalist, first Korean to become a naturalized United States citizen, Media resident from 1925 to 1951
 Graceanna Lewis, ornithologist, abolitionist & suffragist
 Ida Saxton McKinley, First Lady of the United States from 1897 until 1901
 Joan Mondale, Second Lady of the United States from 1977 until 1981
 Mildred Scott Olmsted, peace activist and suffragist; lived at Thunderbird Lodge in Rose Valley, PA until her death at age 100, in 1990
 John Buchanan Robinson, member of the U.S. House of Representatives from Pennsylvania from 1893 to 1899
 V. Gilpin Robinson, Pennsylvania State Representative
 Dr. Anna Howard Shaw, physician and suffragist
 Bill Whitaker, journalist on CBS 60 minutes Business 
 Jonathan Bixby, costume designer
 Samuel D. Riddle, textile mill owner and race-horse owner

 Sports 
 Mark Donohue, racing driver, winner of the 1972 Indianapolis 500
 Harry Kalas, broadcaster for the Philadelphia Phillies
 Lew Krausse Sr., pitcher for the Philadelphia Athletics
 Lew Krausse Jr., pitcher for the Kansas City/Oakland Athletics and other teams
 Phil Martelli, head basketball coach, Saint Joseph's University
 Tug McGraw, pitcher for the New York Mets and Philadelphia Phillies
 Ted Meredith, double Olympic gold medallist
 Auston Trusty, soccer player

 Entertainment 
 John Billingsley, actor
 Jim Croce, singer and songwriter
 Ann Crumb, Broadway actress
 Paul DiMeo, actor, Extreme Makeover: Home Edition''
 Dave Miller, record producer for Bill Haley's early recordings
 Todd Robinson, Emmy-winning director and screenwriter
 Dean Sabatino, drummer for The Dead Milkmen
 Wanda Sykes, actress and comedian

Science 
 John Gibbon, surgeon known for inventing the heart-lung machine

Art 
 Frank Furness, renowned Philadelphia architect
 Charles Lewis Fussell, 19th-century American landscape painter
 Michael A. O'Donnell, author, researcher, international lecturer, and Episcopal priest

References

External links

 
 
 Visit Media PA

County seats in Pennsylvania
Populated places established in 1681
Boroughs in Delaware County, Pennsylvania
Populated places on the Underground Railroad
1850 establishments in Pennsylvania